Balkan ballads (also known as Balkan folk ballads) are the emotional, slow music styles of the Balkan region of Southeastern Europe. Balkan ballads, similar to other ballads, often deal with various themes related to love (unrequited love, love-sickness, romantic and intimate relationships) while using Balkan string instruments such as the šargija, as well as the clarinet, trumpet, accordion, fiddle, guitar and bass guitar. Balkan ballads are distinct from traditional ballads by including a fusion of pop music, folk music and sentimental ballads. Singers usually perform in their native languages.

Characteristics 
Typical ballads use ethnic instrumentation. In recent trends, Balkan ballads commonly implement some degree of westernized instrumentation.

History 
As ballads are traditionally passed down orally, the exact dates of the origin are difficult to determine. However, the earliest recorded ballad, "Judas," Child Ballad no. 23, dates back to the early 1300s.

Over time, the ballad medium spread to the Balkan Peninsula, and has since developed into the narrative and musical art forms present in Balkan culture today.

Examples from Eurovision 
 Doris Dragović – "Željo moja" (Yugoslavia )
 Darja Švajger - "Prisluhni mi" (Slovenia )
 Magazin & Lidija – "Nostalgija" (Croatia )
 Maja Blagdan – "Sveta ljubav" (Croatia )
 Danijela – "Neka mi ne svane" (Croatia )
 Darja Švajger - "For A Thousand Years" (Slovenia )
 Željko Joksimović - "Lane moje" (Serbia & Montenegro )
 Hari Mata Hari - "Lejla" (Bosnia & Herzegovina )
 Marija Šerifović – "Molitva" (Serbia ), which won the contest that year
 Karolina Gočeva – "Mojot svet" (FYR Macedonia ), features a language change to English at the end
 Marija Šestić – "Rijeka bez imena" (Bosnia & Herzegovina )
 Jelena Tomašević - "Oro" (Serbia )
 Regina – "Bistra voda" (Bosnia & Herzegovina )
 Igor Cukrov feat. Andrea – "Lijepa Tena" (Croatia )
 Feminnem – "Lako je sve" (Croatia )
 Maja Keuc – "No One" (Slovenia ), a rare English-language Balkan ballad, although a Slovenian version was performed at the National Final
 Željko Joksimović - "Nije ljubav stvar" (Serbia )
 Kaliopi – "Crno i belo" (FYR Macedonia ), a more rock-based ballad
 Nina Badrić – "Nebo" (Croatia )
 Eva Boto – "Verjamem" (Slovenia )
 Maya Sar – "Korake ti znam" (Bosnia & Herzegovina )
 Klapa s Mora – "Mižerja" (Croatia )
 Sergej Ćetković – "Moj svijet" (Montenegro )
 Knez – "Adio" (Montenegro )
 Dalal & Deen feat. Ana Rucner and Jala – "Ljubav je" (Bosnia & Herzegovina )
 Kaliopi – "Dona" (FYR Macedonia )
Balkanika- "Nova deca" (Serbia )
Vanja Radovanović – "Inje"  (Montenegro )
Nevena Božović – "Kruna" (Serbia )
Tamara Todevska – "Proud" (North Macedonia ) another rare English-language Balkan ballad
Ana Soklič - "Amen" (Slovenia ) another rare English-language Balkan ballad
Anxhela Peristeri - "Karma" (Albania )

References 

Balkan music
Pop music genres